You're Not Alone or You Are Not Alone may refer to:

Albums 
 You Are Not Alone (Kinetics & One Love album), 2012
 You Are Not Alone (Mavis Staples album) or the title song, 2010
 You're Not Alone (Andrew W.K. album) or the title song, 2018
 You're Not Alone (Roy Buchanan album) or the title song, 1978
 You're Not Alone (OK Go and Bonerama EP), 2008
 You're Not Alone (Semisonic EP) or the title song, 2020

Songs 
 "You Are Not Alone", by Michael Jackson, 1995
 "You Are Not Alone" (Modern Talking song), 1999
 "You're Not Alone" (Australian Olympians song), 1988
 "You're Not Alone" (Chicago song), 1988
 "You're Not Alone" (Embrace song), 2000
 "You're Not Alone" (The Enemy song), 2007
 "You're Not Alone" (Joe and Jake song), UK entry for Eurovision 2016
 "You're Not Alone" (Of Mice & Men song), 2013
 "You're Not Alone" (Olive song), 1996; also covered by ATB (2002), Mads Langer (2009), and Scotty Boy & Lizzie Curious (2017)
 "You're Not Alone" (Song4Syria), 2014
 "You're Not Alone" (Tinchy Stryder song), 2009
 "You Are Not Alone", by Adam Brand from Speed of Life, 2020
 "You Are Not Alone", by the Eagles from Long Road Out of Eden, 2007
 "You Are Not Alone", by Emeli Sandé from Real Life, 2019
 "You Are Not Alone", by Lil' Kim from 9, 2019
 "You're Not Alone", by Basshunter from Calling Time, 2013
 "You're Not Alone", by Big Time Rush from Elevate, 2011
 "You're Not Alone", by BWO from Big Science, 2009
 "You're Not Alone", by Downhere from Two at a Time: Sneak Peeks & B-Sides, 2010
 "You're Not Alone", by Dragonforce from Maximum Overload, 2014
 "You're Not Alone", by Meredith Andrews from The Invitation, 2008
 "You're Not Alone", by Owl City from Mobile Orchestra, 2015
 "You're Not Alone", by Saosin from Saosin, 2006
 "You're Not Alone", by Shaye from Lake of Fire, 2006

Other uses
 You Are Not Alone (book), a 2011 biography of Michael Jackson, by Jermaine Jackson
 You Are Not Alone (film), a 1978 Danish film
 "You're Not Alone", an episode of Medical Investigation
 Evangelion: 1.0 You Are (Not) Alone, a 2007 Japanese anime

See also 
 Not Alone (disambiguation)
 We Are Not Alone (disambiguation)